A Zadoff–Chu (ZC) sequence, also referred to as Chu sequence or Frank–Zadoff–Chu (FZC) sequence, is a complex-valued mathematical sequence which, when applied to a signal, gives rise to a new signal of constant amplitude. When cyclically shifted versions of a Zadoff–Chu sequence are imposed upon a signal the resulting set of signals detected at the receiver are uncorrelated with one another.

They are named after Solomon A. Zadoff, David C. Chu and Robert L. Frank.

Description 
Zadoff–Chu sequences exhibit the useful property that cyclically shifted versions of themselves are orthogonal to one another. 

A generated Zadoff–Chu sequence that has not been shifted is known as a root sequence.

The complex value at each position n of each root Zadoff–Chu sequence parametrised by u is given by

 

where

 ,

 ,

 ,

 .

Zadoff–Chu sequences are CAZAC sequences (constant amplitude zero autocorrelation waveform).

Note that the special case  results in a Chu sequence,.

Properties of Zadoff-Chu sequences 
1. They are periodic with period  if  is odd.

  

2. If  is prime, the Discrete Fourier Transform of a Zadoff–Chu sequence is another Zadoff–Chu sequence conjugated, scaled and time scaled.

   where  is the multiplicative inverse of u modulo .

3. The auto correlation of a Zadoff–Chu sequence with a cyclically shifted version of itself is zero, i.e., it is non-zero only at one instant which corresponds to the cyclic shift.

4.

Usages 
Zadoff–Chu sequences are used in the 3GPP Long Term Evolution (LTE) air interface in the Primary Synchronization Signal (PSS), random access preamble (PRACH), uplink control channel (PUCCH), uplink traffic channel (PUSCH) and sounding reference signals (SRS).

By assigning orthogonal Zadoff–Chu sequences to each LTE eNodeB and multiplying their transmissions by their respective codes, the cross-correlation of simultaneous eNodeB transmissions is reduced, thus reducing inter-cell interference and uniquely identifying eNodeB transmissions.

Zadoff–Chu sequences are an improvement over the Walsh–Hadamard codes used in UMTS because they result in a constant-amplitude output signal, reducing the cost and complexity of the radio's power amplifier.

See also
Polyphase sequence

References

Further reading
 
 

Radio communications